Dragon Age is a fantasy media franchise primarily focused on a series of role-playing video games published by Electronic Arts

Dragon Age can also refer to:
Dragon Age (role-playing game), the tabletop role playing game adaptation of the Electronic Arts franchise published by Green Ronin
Monthly Dragon Age, a Japanese shōnen manga magazine published by Fujimi Shobo
Dragon Age Pure, a Japanese shōnen manga magazine published by Fujimi Shobo